John Stewart In Concert is a 1980 remixed reissue of eight tracks from the John Stewart 1974 live album The Phoenix Concerts plus two unreleased live tracks from the same concerts.

Track listing
All compositions by John Stewart
Side one
 "Wheatfield Lady" – 2:15
 "Kansas Rain" – 2:33
 "You Can't Look Back" – 1:35
 "Kansas" – 3:35
 "California Bloodlines" – 3:36
Side two
 "Mother Country" – 5:38
 "Oldest Living Son" – 2:50
 "July, You're a Woman" – 3:30
 "Freeway Pleasure" (previously unreleased) – 2:45
 "Let the Big Horse Run" (previously unreleased) – 4:00

Personnel
 John Stewart – electric guitar, acoustic guitar
 Arnie Moore - bass
 Jonathan Douglas - organ, congas, piano
 Loren Newkirk - piano, organ
 Jim Gordon - drums
 Michael Stewart - rhythm guitar
 Dan Dugmore - pedal steel guitar, electric guitar
 Mike Settle - vocals
 Denny Brooks - vocals
 Buffy Ford - vocals

Additional personnel
 Nikolas Venet - producer
 Tim Bryant - art direction
 Paul Gross - album design
 Marge Meoli - A&R coordinator

John Stewart (musician) albums
Albums produced by Nick Venet
1980 live albums
RCA Records live albums